John Reid Mitchell (October 6, 1926 – February 24, 2012) was a Canadian basketball player who competed in the 1948 Summer Olympics. He was part of the Canadian basketball team, which finished ninth in the Olympic tournament. Mitchell was born in Anyox, British Columbia.

References

External links
Reid Mitchell's profile at the Canadian Olympic Committee
Reid Mitchell's obituary

1926 births
2012 deaths
Basketball people from British Columbia
Basketball players at the 1948 Summer Olympics
Canadian men's basketball players
Olympic basketball players of Canada
People from the Regional District of Kitimat–Stikine
UBC Thunderbirds basketball players